Valdaysky National Park is a national park in the north of Russia, located in Valdaysky, Okulovsky, and Demyansky Districts of Novgorod Oblast. It was established May 17, 1990. Since 2004, the National Park has the status of a UNESCO Biosphere Reserve. Valdaysky National Park, which includes the town of Valday, Lake Valdayskoye, and the northern part of Lake Seliger, is one of the most popular tourist destinations in Central Russia and has well-developed tourist infrastructure.

History
The area of the park in the Middle Ages belonged to the Novgorod Republic. In particular, one of the versions puts the location of the Ignach Cross, a place mentioned in the chronicles where Mongols advancing to Novgorod in 1238 turned back, inside the park limits. (The precise location is unknown). Valday was first mentioned in a chronicle in 1495. The growth of Valday was facilitated by construction of a road connecting Novgorod to Central Russia, and by the foundation of the Valday Iversky Monastery in 1653, which became a major cultural center. All agricultural lands were already in use by the beginning of the 20th century, and the area developed further as recreational region. In 1990, the National Park was opened.

Location and geography

The park is located in the northern, the highest part of the Valdai Hills. The area of the park is divided between three districts of Novgorod Oblast, with 12% located in Okulovsky District, 62% in Valdaysky District, and 26% in Demyansky District. The landscapes of the park were formed during the ice age and are characteristic for glacial landscape forms. In particular, the park contains 76 lakes of various origin. The biggest lakes are Lake Seliger (only a small portion of it lies within the park limits), Lake Valdayskoye, Lake Velyo, Lake Uzhin, and Lake Borovno. The park belongs to the river basins of the Pola, the Msta and the Volga. The Valdayka River, a tributary of the Berezayka River, originates from Lake Uzhin, and the Polomet River, a tributary of the Pola River, also has its source inside the park.

Flora
Water (mostly lakes) occupies 9.2% of the area, swamps — 2.9%. The most common tree species are birch (Betula pubescens, Betula pendula), alder (Alnus incana), spruce (Picea abies), and pine (Pinus sylvestris). A special type are oak forest (about 0.1% of the total forested area), which are in the park at their northern range.

Fauna
In the park, there are fifty species of mammals, 180 species of birds, and about 40 species of fish. Red fox, mink, marten, moose, wild boar, brown bear, lynx, and grey wolf are all common in the park.

Tourism
The park comprises historically significant area, including the town of Valday, Valday Iversky Monastery, and a number of the 19th century estates. The area attracted artists and authors since the 19th century, and is currently one of the most popular tourist destinations in Central Russia. The area of the park is sufficiently covered by roads. There are many recreational facilities, mostly located at and around Lake Valdayskoye and Lake Seliger.

References

External links 

 
 Official Map of Valdaysky National Park (PDF)

Geography of Novgorod Oblast
National parks of Russia
Protected areas established in 1990
Tourist attractions in Novgorod Oblast
1990 establishments in Russia